Katri Sisko "Kaisu" Leppänen (13 October 1904 – 4 March 1993) was a Finnish actress. She worked for over 40 years in the Finnish National Theatre and appeared in 41 films between 1929 and 1987. She was born in Turku, and was married to actor Ilmari Unho from 1927 to 1930. She later married another actor Tauno Majuri. She died in Helsinki, aged 88.

Selected filmography 

 Korkein voitto (1929)
 Ihmiset suviyössä (1948)
 The Girl from Moon Bridge (1953)
 Pastori Jussilainen (1955)
 Täällä Pohjantähden alla (1968)
 Pohjantähti (1973)
 Petos (1988)

References

External links

1904 births
1993 deaths
Actors from Turku
People from Turku and Pori Province (Grand Duchy of Finland)
Finnish film actresses
Finnish silent film actresses
20th-century Finnish actresses